Khel Toh Ab Shuru Hoga is a 2016 Bollywood action film directed by Kunal Singh and produced by Mahesh Narula. The film’s story is about a bank robbery in which actor Ruslaan Mumtaz plays the role of a bank security guard, who ultimately robs the bank. The film was released on 13 May 2016.

Cast
Actress Devshi Khanduri is playing the character of a Muslim girl. Actor Rohit Pathak is playing negative role in the film.

 Ruslaan Mumtaz as Abbas, bank security guard
 Devshi Khanduri as Zara, a Muslim girl
 Rohit Pathak as negative lead
 Khushi Sharma in a negative role
 Shushil Parashar
 Hazel Crowney as item number "«

Soundtrack
The Music Was Composed By  Ashfaque - Nayan Goswami, Ricky Mishra, Aarv, Deepak Agrawal and Released by T-Series.

Production
The film is produced by Delhi-based businessman Mahesh Narula under the production house GMD films. Vikas Phadnis is the Executive Producer of the film.

References

External links
 

Indian heist films
Indian neo-noir films
Indian chase films
2016 films
2010s road movies
Indian road movies
2016 action thriller films
Indian action thriller films
2010s masala films
2010s Hindi-language films
Indian nonlinear narrative films